Pupisoma evada is a tiny species of land snail that is native to eastern Australia.

Description
The depressedly turbinate shell of the mature snail is 1.1–1.2 mm in height, with a diameter of 1.3 mm. It is pale golden-brown in colour. The whorls are shouldered. The sutures are strongly impressed, with fine, irregular radial ribs, with periostracal spines at the shell periphery. It has a circular aperture with a thin lip, and a closed umbilicus.

Distribution and habitat
The snail is found along the coast of eastern Australia from southern New South Wales to southern Queensland, as well as on Lord Howe Island in the Tasman Sea, living in subtropical rainforest and dry vine thickets in trees and shrubs.

References

 
 

 
evada
Gastropods of Australia
Gastropods of Lord Howe Island
Taxa named by Tom Iredale
Gastropods described in 1944